Emil Pálsson (born 10 June 1993) is an Icelandic former professional footballer who played as a midfielder. He played in his native Iceland from 2008 to 2017 and was named the Úrvalsdeild Player of the Year in 2015. He later played several seasons in Norway before severe heart problems ended his career prematurely in 2022. After playing for several of Iceland's junior national teams, he made his lone senior team cap in 2016.

Club career
Emil started his career with local club BÍ/Bolungarvík before signing with FH at 18 years old. In 2015, he was loaned to Fjölnir for the season. After stellar play with Fjölnir, he was recalled on 25 July and finished the season with FH. After the season he was name the Úrvalsdeild Player of the Year.

Cardiac arrest
On 1 November 2021, Emil collapsed and went into a cardiac arrest while playing for Sogndal in a match against Stjørdals-Blink. He was successfully resuscitated, and was then flown to Haukeland University Hospital for further investigation and treatment. He resumed training after being cleared by doctors with the aim of rejoining Sarpsborg 08. In May 2022, after training for 4–5 months, he collapsed again and suffered another cardiac arrest while doing light training with FH. In August 2022, he announced his retirement from football.

International career
Emil made his first senior international appearance on 16 January 2016 in a match against the UAE, playing 46 minutes before being substituted.

Career statistics

References

External links
 
 

1993 births
Living people
Emil Palsson
Emil Palsson
Emil Palsson
Emil Palsson
Emil Palsson
Association football midfielders
Emil Palsson
Emil Palsson
Emil Palsson
Sandefjord Fotball players
Sarpsborg 08 FF players
Emil Palsson
Eliteserien players
Norwegian First Division players
Emil Palsson
Expatriate footballers in Norway
Emil Palsson